Hemithrinax is a genus of palms that is endemic to eastern Cuba. It comprises three species and one variety and was previously included within the genus Thrinax.

 Hemithrinax compacta (Griseb. & H.Wendl.) M.Gómez - Sierra de Nipe in Holguin Province
 Hemithrinax ekmaniana Burret - Las Villas in Granma Province
 Hemithrinax rivularis León - Sierra de Moa in Holguin Province
 Hemithrinax rivularis var. savannarum (León) O.Muñiz - Oriente and Sierra de Moa in Holguin Province.

References

 
Endemic flora of Cuba
Trees of Cuba
Arecaceae genera
Taxa named by William Jackson Hooker